Rick Ladson (born 18 February 1984) is a former Australian Rules Football player who played with the Hawthorn Football Club in the Australian Football League.

AFL career
Ladson was selected at no. 16 in the 2001 AFL Draft from the Bendigo Pioneers and is a defender and outside midfielder.

He debuted in Round 6, 2003, against the Carlton Football Club and continued to play six of 22 possible games in 2003.  In 2004 he suffered a fractured wrist in a pre-season game and missed the first seven games. In 2006, Ladson played all 22 games with an average of 18 disposals per game and finished ninth in the Best and Fairest. In 2007, Ladson continued his form, missing only two games in the home and away season and playing two finals games.

Ladson played in every game of the 2008 season, culminating in being a part of Hawthorn's premiership winning side. During the 2008 AFL Grand Final, he kicked the goal that was widely regarded as having sealed the game for the Hawks. He had arthroscopic surgery on his left knee after that season, delaying his return until Round 13.  He only played three games before he injured his right knee, which also required surgery and resulted in Ladson missing the remainder of the season.

Post-AFL Career

For the 2012 season he was working with the Essendon Football Club as a development coach.

In 2013, Ladson was the playing-coach for the Golden Square Football Club in the Bendigo Football League, coaching them to their fifth consecutive premiership.

Ladson has been the coach of Sedgwick Cricket Club since the 2014/15 season.

Statistics

|- style=background:#EAEAEA
| 2002 ||  || 18
| 0 || — || — || — || — || — || — || — || — || — || — || — || — || — || — || 0
|-
| 2003 ||  || 18
| 6 || 5 || 4 || 38 || 14 || 52 || 13 || 10 || 0.8 || 0.7 || 6.3 || 2.3 || 8.7 || 2.2 || 1.7 || 0
|- style=background:#EAEAEA
| 2004 ||  || 18
| 8 || 5 || 1 || 35 || 26 || 61 || 11 || 10 || 0.6 || 0.1 || 4.4 || 3.3 || 7.6 || 1.4 || 1.3 || 0
|-
| 2005 ||  || 18
| 16 || 7 || 3 || 142 || 74 || 216 || 61 || 30 || 0.4 || 0.2 || 8.9 || 4.6 || 13.5 || 3.8 || 1.9 || 0
|- style=background:#EAEAEA
| 2006 ||  || 4
| 22 || 7 || 10 || 252 || 146 || 398 || 104 || 36 || 0.3 || 0.5 || 11.5 || 6.6 || 18.1 || 4.7 || 1.6 || 0
|-
| 2007 || | || 4
| 22 || 10 || 3 || 275 || 180 || 455 || 101 || 38 || 0.5 || 0.1 || 12.5 || 8.2 || 20.7 || 4.6 || 1.7 || 0
|- style=background:#EAEAEA
| bgcolor=F0E68C | 2008# ||  || 4
| 25 || 3 || 9 || 229 || 261 || 490 || 106 || 69 || 0.1 || 0.4 || 9.2 || 10.4 || 19.6 || 4.2 || 2.8 || 0
|-
| 2009 ||  || 4
| 3 || 1 || 0 || 19 || 27 || 46 || 6 || 8 || 0.3 || 0.0 || 6.3 || 9.0 || 15.3 || 2.0 || 2.7 || 0
|- style=background:#EAEAEA
| 2010 ||  || 4
| 13 || 5 || 6 || 127 || 76 || 203 || 36 || 43 || 0.4 || 0.5 || 9.8 || 5.8 || 15.6 || 2.8 || 3.3 || 0
|-
| 2011 ||  || 4
| 10 || 2 || 3 || 92 || 52 || 144 || 26 || 36 || 0.2 || 0.3 || 9.2 || 5.2 || 14.4 || 2.6 || 3.6 || 0
|- class="sortbottom"
! colspan=3| Career:
! 125 !! 45 !! 39 !! 1209 !! 856 !! 2065 !! 464 !! 280 !! 0.4 !! 0.3 !! 9.7 !! 6.8 !! 16.5 !! 3.7 !! 2.2 !! 0
|}

Honours and achievements
Team
 AFL premiership player: 2008

Individual
  life member

References

External links

 
 

1984 births
Living people
Australian rules footballers from Victoria (Australia)
Hawthorn Football Club players
Hawthorn Football Club Premiership players
Bendigo Pioneers players
Golden Square Football Club players
One-time VFL/AFL Premiership players